Valerian Ume-Ezeoke  (born February 14, 1993) is a former American football center. He is now a graduate assistant for the UMass Minutemen football program. He played college football at New Mexico State University.

Early life
Born the son of Anthony and Tina Ume-Ezeoke, Valerian attended Lakeview Centennial High School in Garland, Texas, where he was a member of the Patriots football team. Ume-Ezeoke played both offensive and defensive line for the Patriots, earning an All-State as a sophomore and junior.

Recruiting
Ume-Ezeoke committed to New Mexico State University on September 2, 2010. He choose New Mexico State over football scholarships from the United States Air Force Academy, Colorado State University, and Tennessee State University.

College career
Ume-Ezeoke came in played in 8 games as a true freshman, starting six of those games. As a sophomore, Ume-Ezeoke started all 12 games for the Aggies. Ume-Ezeoke was named to the Rimington Trophy watch list as a junior, again starting all 12 games for the Aggies. As a senior in 2014, Ume-Ezeoke was once again added to the Rimington Tropher watch list and earned All-Sun Belt Conference First Team as an offensive lineman.

Professional career
Prior to the 2015 NFL Draft, Ume-Ezeoke was projected to be undrafted by NFLDraftScout.com. He was rated as the twentieth-best center in the draft.

Atlanta Falcons
On May 6, 2015, Ume-Ezeoke signed as an undrafted free agent with the Atlanta Falcons. Ume-Ezeoke was cut during the first round of Falcons' cuts on August 30, 2015.

Arizona Cardinals
On January 5, 2016, Ume-Ezeoke was signed by the Arizona Cardinals to a future/reserve contract. On May 4, 2016, he was cut by the Cardinals.

Pittsburgh Steelers
On August 1, 2016, Ume-Ezeoke signed with the Pittsburgh Steelers. On August 20, 2016, the Steelers waived/injured Ume-Ezeoke and was placed on injured reserve.

References

External links
New Mexico State bio
Pittsburgh Steelers bio

Living people
1993 births
American people of Igbo descent
American sportspeople of Nigerian descent
Igbo sportspeople
Players of American football from Texas
Sportspeople from the Dallas–Fort Worth metroplex
People from Garland, Texas
American football centers
New Mexico State Aggies football players
Atlanta Falcons players
Arizona Cardinals players
Pittsburgh Steelers players